is an upcoming World Expo organised and sanctioned by the Bureau International des Expositions (BIE), which will be held in Osaka, Japan. It will take place for six months during 2025, opening 13 April 2025 and closing 13 October 2025. This will be the third time Osaka hosts a World Expo, having previously hosted Expo 1970 and Expo 1990. The event will return to its traditional 5-year scheduling cycle after the Expo 2020 was delayed to 2021 and 2022 due to the COVID-19 pandemic. The projected visitor count is approximately 28 million.

Theme
The theme for the expo is "Designing Future Society for Our Lives", with sub-themes of "Saving Lives", "Empowering Lives" and "Connecting Lives". The theme "Saving Lives" includes infant vaccinations, sanitation, lifestyle (diet and exercise) and extending lifespans.

Pavilions

International Organizations
 
 
 
 
 International Solar Alliance
 ITER
 Pacific Islands Forum

Directors
The directors of the expo were announced on 23 May 2019 and include Hiroyuki Ikeda, Kengo Sakurada, Hirofumi Yoshimura (Governor of Osaka), and Ichirō Matsui (Mayor of Osaka), with Hiroyuki Ishige as the secretary general, and Hiroyuki Takeuchi and Manatsu Ichinoki acting as vice secretaries general.

The current Chairman and Representative Director of the Japan Association for the 2025 World Exposition is Masakazu Tokura, Chairman of the Japan Business Federation. He has been the Chairman and Representative Director of the Japan Association for the 2025 World Exposition since June 2021.

Bidding, selection and ratification of Expo city

Ratification
The registration dossier for Japan's expo containing a detailed plan with proposed operational dates (13 April to 13 October 2025) and legacy plans has been submitted to the BIE for review.

Candidates 
On 22 November 2016, France submitted to the BIE its candidature to host World Expo 2025. This first submission launched the bidding process for this Expo by opening the candidate list. All other countries wishing to organise World Expo 2025 had until 22 May 2017 to submit their own bids, after which the project examination phase started.

  Baku, Azerbaijan – The Azerbaijani capital entered its candidacy before the deadline under the theme "Developing Human Capital, Building a Better Future".
  Osaka, Japan – Osaka made its official bid for the Expo on 24 April 2017 with the theme "Designing Future Society for Our Lives".
  Yekaterinburg, Russia – The Russian city entered its candidacy on 22 May 2017 under the theme "Changing the World: Innovations and Better Life for Future Generations".

Withdrawn candidates
  Paris, France – France, which had been the first to declare its candidacy under the theme "Sharing our Knowledge, Caring for our Planet," withdrew its candidacy on 21 January 2018 due to financial concerns and protests against Emmanuel Macron.

Vote
A secret ballot took place to select the winner at BIE's 164th General Assembly on 23 November 2018. The first ballot awarded 85 votes to Osaka, 48 votes to Yekaterinburg and 23 votes to Baku, which meant that Baku was eliminated. The second round ballot resulted in 92 votes for Osaka and 61 for Yekaterinburg.

See also
World's fair
List of world expositions

References

External links 

 BIE Paris World Expo 2025 microsite
 Osaka 2025 bid (archival)

2025 festivals
2025 in Japan
Culture in Osaka
Scheduled events
World's fairs in Osaka